Ouch is a town in Lower Dir District, Khyber Pakhtunkhwa, Pakistan.

Educational institutions
 Degree College Gulabad Ouch (for boys)
 Degree College (for girls)
 Govt. Higher Secondary School Ouch
 Govt. High School Ouch
 Govt. Higher Secondary School Khair Abad Ouch
 Govt. Higher Secondary School Kotigram Ouch
 Govt. High School Maina Battan Ouch
 Govt. Girls Middle School Warsak, Ouch
 Govt. Boys Middle School, Warsak, Ouch
PRIVATE SCHOOLS
 Progressive Model school.
 Alhuda schools and College.
 Islamya Model School.
 Vision Model school.
 Adenzai Model school.
 Alnasir Public School.
 Almeezan Public school.
 Alnajam School.
 Cordoba school.
Angel House School.
Oxford Garamer school Batan.
new angel house school syster  janza ouch
MADRASAS
 Jamia Mazharul Islam Mosque
 Jamia Mehmodia Ouch Sharqi
 JAMIA MADINE AND MOSQUE GUL SHAHAN ABAD OUCH
 JAMIA Abubakar sadiq mina Ouch.
 madrasa jamia esat tul quran west ouch gul shan abad

Health facilities
 RHC Ouch
 TB Health Center Ouch

Sporting teams
Young people in Ouch play games like volleyball, football, cricket, hockey, and other local games. A stadium in Ouch East named Ouch Sport Stadium serves as the main sporting place. The main sports organizations include:

Volleyball
 Rafiq Adenzai VBC Ouch
 Darakshan VBC Ouch
 Adenzai VBC Ouch
 Khamar VBC Ouch Maina (Ghufran, Azad Khan)
 Insaf VBC Ouch.

Cricket
 Ramzan Club Ouch
 Friends Club Ouch
 Young Star Ouch
 Ouch Eleven Club the pioneer cricket club in village 
 Fighter 11 club ouch

Football
Ouch Eleven Football Club
 Aangar FBC Ouch
 Ouch FBC Ouch West
Shehbaz Shaheed FC Ouch West

Archaeological sites

Aandan Dherai
According to the Buddhist pilgrim Xuan Zang, there is a legend about what Buddha did at this site. According to the legend, Buddha transformed into an enormous serpent lying dead in the valley in order to save the people from famine. The starving people ate the snake and were saved. According to another tradition, Gandhāra is the location of the mystical Lake Dhanakosha, birthplace of Padmasambhava, founder of Tibetan Buddhism.

The Kagyu sect of Tibetan Buddhism identifies the lake with the Alladun Dheri stupa and believes a spring flows from the base of the stupa to form the lake. Archaeologists have found the stupa but no spring or lake can be identified. Aandhan Dehrai Stupa was excavated by Professor Ahmad Dani who recovered over 500 pieces of Gandhara sculpture.

Laram Top Ouch

Laram, known for its lush green hills, is a popular destination for tourists. The important surrounding hamlets include Danda, Tangobagh, Segay, Babakhwar, Kasso, Gudyakhwar etc. Timergara is lying on its western side with the famous modern tourist resort of Malam Jaba being on its eastern side. On its south western side is the famous historical Talash Valley.

Laram Sar can be reached from different areas such as Rabat, Talash, Ouch and Timergara. The second road goes from Rabat Bazaar. The mountain top has a radar system and TV signal booster.

See also
 Lower Dir District
 Timergara
 Chakdara
 Swat District

Populated places in Lower Dir District
Lower Dir District